The Partisan in War is a pamphlet written by the German soldier Andreas Emmerich (born 1739; also known as Colonel Andrew Emmerick). 

It is a treatise on light infantry tactics learned in the Seven Years' War under Duke Ferdinand of Brunswick, and in the American Revolutionary War. Emmerich had commanded the British Emmerich's Chasseurs regiment during the Revolutionary War. The treatise was dedicated in 1789 to Prince Frederick, Duke of York and Albany.

Emmerich was executed by occupying French forces in 1809.

See also
Partisan (military)

External links
The Partisan in War complete text

History books about the American Revolution
Pamphlets
1789 non-fiction books